Top Elf is an American reality competition television program that aired on Nickelodeon from November 29, 2019 to December 17, 2020.

Premise 
In Top Elf, Santa (Tommy Snider) and Ms. Jingles (Samantha Turret) invite seven civilian "Elf-testants" to the North Pole in a competition to test their skills in a series of holiday-themed challenges. Demonstrating the true spirit of the holidays, the Elf-testants compete to have their wish lists granted--not for themselves, but for someone in their community.

Production 
On August 28, 2019, it was announced that Nickelodeon ordered the series from Mike and Tim Duffy of Ugly Brother Studios. On November 18, 2019, it was announced that the program would premiere on November 29, 2019, and would feature Frankie Grande, Amirah Kassem, Peyton List, Alex Wassabi and Pete Wentz as guest judges.

On February 19, 2020, it was announced that Nickelodeon renewed the series for a second season. On November 12, 2020, it was announced that the second season would premiere on November 19, 2020, and would feature Addison Rae, Jay Pharoah, Tori Kelly, Guava Juice and JoJo Siwa as guest judges.

Episodes

Series overview

Season 1 (2019)

Season 2 (2020)

Ratings 
 

| link2             = #Season 2 (2020)
| episodes2         = 5
| start2            = 
| end2              = 
| startrating2      = 0.23
| endrating2        = 0.32
| viewers2          = |2}} 
}}

References

External links 
 
 

Nickelodeon original programming
2010s American reality television series
2020s American reality television series
2010s Nickelodeon original programming
2020s Nickelodeon original programming
2019 American television series debuts
2020 American television series endings
American children's reality television series